An event study is a statistical method to assess the impact of an event on the value of a firm. For example, the announcement of a merger between two business entities can be analyzed to see whether investors believe the merger will create or destroy value.  The basic idea is to find the abnormal return attributable to the event being studied by adjusting for the return that stems from the price fluctuation of the market as a whole.  The event study was invented by Ball and Brown (1968).

As the event methodology can be used to elicit the effects of any type of event on the direction and magnitude of stock price changes, it is very versatile. Event studies are thus common to various research areas, such as accounting and finance, management, economics, marketing, information technology, law, political science, operations and supply chain management.

One aspect often used to structure the overall body of event studies is the breadth of the studied event types. On the one hand, there is research investigating the stock market responses to economy-wide events (i.e., market shocks, such as regulatory changes, or catastrophic events). On the other hand, event studies are used to investigate the stock market responses to corporate events, such as mergers and acquisitions, earnings announcements, debt or equity issues, corporate reorganisations, investment decisions and corporate social responsibility (MacKinlay 1997; McWilliams & Siegel, 1997).

Methodology
The general event study methodology is explained in, for example, MacKinlay (1997) or Mitchell and Netter (1994). In MacKinlay (1997), this is done "using financial market data" to "measure the impact of a specific event on the value of a firm". He argues that "given rationality in the marketplace, the effects of an event will be reflected immediately in security prices. Thus a measure of the event's economic impact can be constructed using security prices observed over a relatively short time period". It is important to note that short-horizon event studies are more reliable than long-horizon event studies as the latter have many limitations. However, Kothari and Warner (2005) were able to refine long-horizon methodologies in order to improve the design and reliability of the studies over longer periods.

Empirical Methods 
Methodologically, event studies imply the following: Based on an estimation window prior to the analyzed event, the method estimates what the normal stock returns of the affected firm(s) should be at the day of the event and several days prior and after the event (i.e., during the event window). Thereafter, the method deducts this 'normal returns' from the 'actual returns' to receive 'abnormal returns' attributed to the event.

Event studies, however, may differ with respect to their specification of normal returns. The most common model for normal returns is the 'market model' (MacKinlay 1997). Following this model, the analysis implies to use an estimation window (typically sized 120 days) prior to the event to derive the typical relationship between the firm's stock and a reference index through a regression analysis. Based on the regression coefficients, the normal returns are then projected and used to calculate the abnormal returns. Alternative models for the normal returns include the CAPM model, or more simplistic approaches such as mean returns (see MacKinlay 1997 for an overview).

Calculation of abnormal returns 
Depending on the model chosen for the 'normal return', conducting event studies requires the researcher to implement a distinct sequence of steps. For the most common model, the 'market model', the steps are as follows:
 Retrieve and match time series of financial returns of the focal firm's stock and its reference index. 
 For each event, identify the sequences of firm and market returns that need to be included in the estimation window. 
 Using regression analysis, calculate the alpha, beta and sigma coefficients that explicate the typical relationship between the stock and the reference index. 
 With these three parameters, predict the 'normal returns' for all days of the event window. 
 Deducting these 'normal returns' from the 'actual returns' gives you the 'abnormal returns' which are the metrics of interest.

Significance of abnormal returns 
To specify if individual abnormal returns differ from zero with some statistical validity, test statistics need to be applied. Various test statistics at the different levels of analysis (i.e., AR-, CAR-, AAR- and CAAR-level) exist for this purpose. The most common test, the t-test, divides the abnormal returns through the root mean square error of the regression. Resulting t-values need then to be compared with the critical values of the Student's t-distribution. There is some evidence that during times of high volatility (e.g. financial crisis of 2007–2008), too many companies tend to show significantly abnormal returns using the t-test, which makes it more difficult to determine which returns are truly "abnormal".

Software for conducting event studies 
Event studies can be implemented with various different tools. Single event studies can easily be implemented with MS Excel, event studies covering multiple events need to be built using statistical software packages (e.g., STATA, Matlab). Besides of these multi-use tools, there are solutions tailored to conducting event study analyses (e.g., Eventus,  EventStudyTools).

Application to merger analysis
The logic behind the event study methodology (within the specific context of mergers) is explained in Warren-Boulton and Dalkir (2001): 
Investors in financial markets bet their dollars on whether a merger will raise or lower prices. A merger that raises market prices will benefit both the merging parties and their rivals and thus raise the prices for all their shares.  Conversely, the financial community may expect the efficiencies from the merger to be sufficiently large to drive down prices.  In this case, the share values of the merging firms’ rivals fall as the probability of the merger goes up.  Thus, evidence from financial markets can be used to predict market price effects when significant merger-related events have taken place.

Warren-Boulton and Dalkir (2001) apply their event-probability methodology to the proposed merger between Staples, Inc. and Office Depot (1996), which was challenged by the Federal Trade Commission and eventually withdrawn.

Findings
Warren-Boulton and Dalkir (2001) find highly significant returns to the only rival firm in the relevant market.  Based on these returns, they are able to estimate the price effect of the merger in the product market which is highly consistent with the estimates of the likely price increase from other independent sources.

Application in litigation
The results of event studies have been accepted as evidence in litigation in US, in the quantification of damages in cases relating to securities fraud.

See also

 Post earnings announcement drift, an anomaly found in event studies of earnings announcements
 CRSP, database commonly used in event studies

References

McGuckin, R. H., F. R. Warren-Boulton, and P. Waldstein. “The Use of Stock Market Returns in Antitrust Analysis of Mergers,” Review of Industrial Organization Vol. 7 (1992). https://www.jstor.org/stable/41798368
McWilliams, A. and Siegel, D. "Event studies in management research: Theoretical and empirical issues" Academy of Management Journal, Vol. 40, No. 3, (1997)  https://www.jstor.org/stable/257056

Valuation (finance)